The NBA Canada Series are a series of basketball games featuring National Basketball Association teams that are played in Canada.

History
The first official series started in 2012 although previous preseason games have been played in Canada outside of Toronto before. Specifically in October 1990 the Indiana Pacers played three games against the Bullets and Rockets. These 3 games would be played in St. Johns, Newfoundland, Halifax Nova Scotia, then Kitchener Ontario. There was no series in 2017 due to the early start of the season. Planning for the series was overseen by Dan MacKenzie, vice-president and managing director NBA Canada.

NBA Canada Series games

2012

2013

2014

2015

2016

2018

2019

2022

See also
 NBA Global Games
 List of games played between NBA and international teams
 NBA versus EuroLeague games
 McDonald's Championship
 EuroLeague American Tour
 Naismith Cup

References

National Basketball Association